Yaminsky is a rural locality (a khutor) and the administrative center of Yaminskoye Rural Settlement, Alexeyevsky District, Volgograd Oblast, Russia. The population was 1,529 as of 2013.

Geography 
The village is located 5 km north-east from Alexeyevskaya, on the left bank of the Buzuluk River.

References 

Rural localities in Alexeyevsky District, Volgograd Oblast